This article shows all participating team squads at the 2010 Men's Pan-American Volleyball Cup, held from May 22 to May 30, 2010 in San Juan, Puerto Rico.

Head Coach: Alejandro Grossi

Head Coach: Roberley Leonaldo

Head Coach: Glenn Hoag

Head Coach: Horacio Dileo

Head Coach: Jacinto Campechano

Head Coach: Jorge Azair

Head Coach: Carlos Cardona

Head Coach: Richard Mclaughlin

Head Coach: Iván Nieto

References
 NORCECA

P
P